As the 35th anniversary of the Super Sentai franchise, Kaizoku Sentai Gokaiger features several guest appearances from actors who starred or appeared in the previous 34 Super Sentai series reprising their roles.

Past protagonists
During the events of Kaizoku Sentai Gokaiger, the 34 previous Sentai teams participated in the Legend War to prevent Earth from falling to the Zangyack Empire, sacrificing their powers in order to do so. Over the course of the series, the Sentai warriors encounter the Gokaigers, Zangyack, and the privateer Basco ta Jolokia for varying reasons, such as to get their powers back and/or give their blessing to the Gokaigers. After the Gokaigers defeat Zangyack and Jolokia, they return their predecessors' powers to their respective owners.

Tsuyoshi Kaijo

Kaijo takes part in the Legend War, leading the first 34 Super Sentai teams against the Zangyack Empire's first invasion fleet before calling for his allies to sacrifice their powers. During the events of the crossover film Gokaiger Goseiger Super Sentai 199 Hero Great Battle, Kaijo gives his blessing and access to his team's Great Power to the Gokaigers to help them defeat the Black Cross Colossus. After the Gokaigers defeat the Zangyack Empire during the series finale, Kaijo receives his powers back and thanks the pirates.

Aka Red
 is the physical embodiment of the Super Sentai's red warriors' spirits who is capable of using all of their powers via his Soul Advent ability.

Following the Legend War, he forms the Red Pirates to search the universe for the Ranger Keys, taking Captain Marvelous and Basco ta Jolokia under his wing. However, Jolokia learned of Aka Red's intentions and sold out the Red Pirates to the Zangyack Empire. Aka Red makes Marvelous promise to find the Greatest Treasure in the Universe and entrusts him with the Ranger Keys, Gokai Galleon, and Navi before leading Zangyack forces away from Marvelous, seemingly sacrificing himself in the process. After the Gokaigers defeat the Zangyack Empire, Aka Red appears before Marvelous and thanks him before disappearing once more.

Kai Ozu
 is the youngest of the Ozu siblings who led the Magiranger family as  against the Infershia Empire's forces before they destroyed their emperor, N-Ma, becoming a liaison to the reformed Infershia in the process.

Marika Reimon

She arrests Captain Marvelous when he seeks out the police while searching for the Greatest Treasure in the Universe. A fight ensues between them, though Captain Marvelous escapes.

Doggie Kruger

In the series' first episode and the film Gokaiger Goseiger Super Sentai 199 Hero Great Battle, Kruger takes part in the Legend War, fighting alongside his fellow Sentai supporting warriors before sacrificing his powers to destroy the Zangyack Empire's first invasion fleet. In the present, he encounters Captain Marvelous and reluctantly works with him to stop an Alienizer working with Zangyack. Despite his initial distrust, Kruger eventually chooses to have faith in the pirate's sense of pride in walking in his own path before giving the Gokaigers his blessing and access to his team's Great Power. After the pirates defeat the Zangyack Empire in the series finale, Kruger and Signalman receive their powers back and salute the Gokaigers as thanks.

Banban Akaza

After the Gokaigers earn his team's Great Power, Akaza clears them of their piracy charges and playfully threatens repercussions if they misuse his team's powers.

Jyan Kandou

After encountering them, Kandou teaches Don Dogoier and Ahim de Famille the ways of Geki Jūken so they can access the Gekirangers' Great Power and defeat Pachacamac XIII, wholeheartedly seeing the Gokaigers as part of the Super Sentai.

Master Xia Fu
 is the grand master of the  style of Jūken, the Gekirangers' mentor, and leader of the Seven Kensei.

After the Gokaigers earn the Gekirangers' Great Power, Xia Fu questions Kandou's trust in the pirates, though the latter affirms his decision.

Kakeru Shishi

While he initially sees the Gokaigers as selfish and typical of pirates, Shishi changes his mind after Don Dogoier and Ahim de Famille convince him otherwise and he sees the Gokaigers fighting altruistically.

Kaoru Shiba
 is a noblewoman and the 18th head of the Shiba House who was secretly trained to be a samurai and seal the Gedoushu as  while her kagemusha, Takeru Shiba led the Shinkengers in her place.

When the Gokaigers seek out a samurai as part of their quest for the Greatest Treasure in the Universe, Shiba challenges them to a duel in the hopes of retrieving the Shinkenger Ranger Keys. Joe Gibken steps up to her challenge, but a Zangyack attack forces them to postpone their duel. After seeing the Gokaigers' bonds while helping treat Captain Marvelous' injuries, she gives Gibken a Secret Disk, her blessing, and access to her team's Great Power. During the events of the film Tokumei Sentai Go-Busters vs. Kaizoku Sentai Gokaiger: The Movie, Shiba delivers a message to the Go-Busters to help them reunite with their comrades after they had been sent back in time.

Toshizo Tanba
 is Kaoru Shiba's arrogant yet fiercely loyal retainer.

He accompanies her in attempting to retrieve the Shinkenger Ranger Keys from the Gokaigers, helping civilians amidst a Zangyack attack, and treating Captain Marvelous' injuries. While on the Gokai Galleon, Tanba suggests stealing the Shinkenger Keys, but Shiba disapproves.

Kyosuke Jinnai

Following the Legend War, he decides to teach traffic safety to young kids. After encountering the Gokaigers, he reveals his identity and offers to help them earn his team's Great Power in exchange for their help in a traffic safety acting troupe. Despite getting caught in a love triangle between Zangyack scientist Insarn and one of the empire's Action Commanders, Jinnai follows through on his promise.

Tensou Sentai Goseiger
 are the 34th Super Sentai team and five  - Alata, Eri, Agri, Moune, and Hyde - and an advanced  called , who follow their kind's mission to protect Earth from all evil, having battled numerous villain groups manipulated by the fallen Gosei Angel Brajira of the Messiah.

During the events of the film Gokaiger Goseiger Super Sentai 199 Hero Great Battle, the Gosei Angels steal back their powers before battling the Gokaigers to restore Gosei Knight, who had reverted to his Groundion Headder form. After eventually joining forces to defeat the Black Cross King, the Goseigers accept the Gokaigers as a Sentai team and give the pirates their blessing and access to their Great Power.

Sokichi Banba

During the events of the film Gokaiger Goseiger Super Sentai 199 Hero Great Battle, Banba helps Tsuyoshi Kaijo in covering the Goseigers so they can take part in the Legend War before sacrificing their powers to destroy the Zangyack Empire's first invasion fleet. In the present, Banba gives the Gokaigers his blessing and access to his team's Great Power.

Wolzard Fire

During the events of the film Gokaiger Goseiger Super Sentai 199 Hero Great Battle, Isamu leads the Super Sentai teams' supporting warriors during the Legend War before sacrificing his powers to destroy the Zangyack Empire's first invasion fleet.

Signalman
 is a robotic figure from the Police Planet who aided the Carrangers in their first against the Bowzock gang.

During the events of the film Gokaiger Goseiger Super Sentai 199 Hero Great Battle, Signalman takes part in the Legend War, fighting alongside his fellow Sentai supporting warriors before sacrificing his powers to destroy the Zangyack Empire's first invasion fleet. Due to the temporary loss of his original form, Signalman was regressed to an inanimate form, which Doggie Kruger of S.P.D. safeguarded. After the Gokaigers defeat the Zangyack Empire in the series finale, Signalman reverts to his original form and accompanies Kruger in saluting the Gokaigers as a sign of thanks.

Zubaan
 is a Lemurian Precious called "The Golden Sword" that can assume a humanoid form and aided the Boukengers in fighting the Negative Syndicates and protecting other Precious.

During the events of the film Gokaiger Goseiger Super Sentai 199 Hero Great Battle, Zubaan takes part in the Legend War, fighting alongside his fellow Sentai supporting warriors before sacrificing his powers to destroy the Zangyack Empire's first invasion fleet.

Hyuuga

During the events of the film Gokaiger Goseiger Super Sentai 199 Hero Great Battle, Hyuuga takes part in the Legend War, fighting alongside his fellow Sentai supporting warriors before sacrificing his powers to destroy the Zangyack Empire's first invasion fleet. During the series, Hyuuga is attacked by Basco Ta Jolokia for his team's Great Power before being saved by the Gokaigers. While under their protection, Hyuuga tests Gai Ikari's self-worth and entrusts him with the Black Knight Ranger Key and the Gingamen's Great Power after Ikari passes.

Aorenger
, aka , is a member of EAGLE who joined the Gorengers in fighting the Black Cross Army.

During the events of the film Gokaiger Goseiger Super Sentai 199 Hero Great Battle, Aorenger takes part in the Legend War before sacrificing his powers to destroy the Zangyack Empire's first invasion fleet.

Aorenger is voiced by Hiroshi Miyauchi, who reprises his role from Himitsu Sentai Gorenger and also appears as Sokichi Banba of J.A.K.Q. Dengekitai.

Ninja Red
, aka , is a descendant of Sarutobi Sasuke who was tricked into freeing the Youkai Army Corps from their imprisonment and joined the Kakurangers to re-seal them.

During the events of the film Gokaiger Goseiger Super Sentai 199 Hero Great Battle, Sasuke takes part in the Legend War before sacrificing his powers to destroy the Zangyack Empire's first invasion fleet.

Ninja Red is voiced by Teruaki Ogawa, who reprises his role from Ninja Sentai Kakuranger and also appears as Hyuuga of Seijuu Sentai Gingaman.

Chiaki Tani

During the events of the film Gokaiger Goseiger Super Sentai 199 Hero Great Battle, Tani takes part in the Legend War before sacrificing his powers to destroy the Zangyack Empire's first invasion fleet and regrouping with teammate Genta Umemori, among other Super Sentai members. In the present, he and Umemori appear before the Gokaigers to reaffirm their team's blessing in them.

Genta Umemori

During the events of the film Gokaiger Goseiger Super Sentai 199 Hero Great Battle, Umemori takes part in the Legend War before sacrificing his powers to destroy the Zangyack Empire's first invasion fleet and regrouping with teammate Chiaki Tani, among other Super Sentai members. In the present, he and Tani appear before the Gokaigers to reaffirm their team's blessing in them.

Saki Rōyama
Along the way, she briefly forms the  idol group to defeat a separate foe.

During the events of the film Gokaiger Goseiger Super Sentai 199 Hero Great Battle, Rōyama takes part in the Legend War before sacrificing her powers to destroy the Zangyack Empire's first invasion fleet and regrouping with other Super Sentai members. In the present, she gives the Gokaigers her blessing and access to her team's Great Power. In the film Kaizoku Sentai Gokaiger the Movie: The Flying Ghost Ship, the Gokaigers use the Gorengers' powers to summon an illusion of Rōyama and her fellow G3 Princess members to help them defeat Baseball Mask.

Satoru Akashi

During the events of the film Gokaiger Goseiger Super Sentai 199 Hero Great Battle, Akashi takes part in the Legend War before sacrificing his powers to destroy the Zangyack Empire's first invasion fleet and regrouping with other Super Sentai members. In the present, he gives the Gokaigers his blessing and access to his team's Great Power. Following this, Akashi questions whether the Gokaigers' actions were what Aka Red intended for.

Daigoro Oume

During the events of the film Gokaiger Goseiger Super Sentai 199 Hero Great Battle, Oume takes part in the Legend War before sacrificing his powers to destroy the Zangyack Empire's first invasion fleet. Following this, he became a traveling anpan vendor for elementary schools. In the present, he helps Ryo of the Heavenly Fire Star and Koume "Umeko" Kodou in saving a laid-off salaryman before giving the Gokaigers his blessing and access to his team's Great Power. In the film Kaizoku Sentai Gokaiger vs. Space Sheriff Gavan: The Movie, Oume and Shiro Akebono help the Gokaigers rescue Retsu Ichijouji.

Daigoro Oume is portrayed by  who reprises his role from Denshi Sentai Denjiman and also appears as Shiro Akebono of Battle Fever J and Retsu Ichijouji of Space Sheriff Gavan.

Ryo of the Heavenly Fire Star
 is a descendant of the Dai Tribe who was chosen to become the Dairangers' leader, to fight the Gorma Tribe.

During the events of the film Gokaiger Goseiger Super Sentai 199 Hero Great Battle, Ryo takes part in the Legend War before sacrificing his powers to defeat the Zangyack Empire's first invasion fleet. In the present, Ryo meets Daigoro Oume and Koume "Umeko" Kodou and helps them save a laid-off salaryman before giving the Gokaigers his blessing and access to his team's Great Power. In the series, Ryo encounters Gai Ikari after the latter temporarily lost his transformation equipment and helps the latter realize he did not need them to be a hero.

Koume Kodou

During the events of the film Gokaiger Goseiger Super Sentai 199 Hero Great Battle, she takes part in the Legend War before sacrificing her powers to destroy the Zangyack Empire's first invasion fleet. In the present, she and Murphy almost run over a laid-off salaryman before receiving help from Daigoro Oume and Ryo of the Heavenly Fire Star in helping the man. She later appears before the Gokaigers to reaffirm her team's blessing in them.

Kanpei Kuroda

During the events of the film Gokaiger Goseiger Super Sentai 199 Hero Great Battle, Kuroda takes part in the Legend War before sacrificing his powers to destroy the Zangyack Empire's first invasion fleet. In the present, he gives the Gokaigers his blessing and access to his team's Great Power.

Rei Tachibana

During the events of the film Gokaiger Goseiger Super Sentai 199 Hero Great Battle, Tachibana takes part in the Legend War before sacrificing her powers to destroy the Zangyack Empire's first invasion fleet. In the present, she gives the Gokaigers her blessing and access to her team's Great Power.

Shirō Gō

During the events of the film Gokaiger Goseiger Super Sentai 199 Hero Great Battle, Gō takes part in the Legend War before sacrificing his powers to destroy the Zangyack Empire's first invasion fleet. In the present, he gives the Gokaigers his blessing and access to his team's Great Power.

Riki Honoo

During the events of the film Gokaiger Goseiger Super Sentai 199 Hero Great Battle, Honoo takes part in the Legend War before sacrificing his powers to destroy the Zangyack Empire's first invasion fleet. In the present, he gives the Gokaigers his blessing and access to his team's Great Power.

Nozomu Amachi
 is an elementary school student who befriends the Goseigers and offers them sanctuary at his and his father's home, the Amachi Institute.

During the events of the film Gokaiger Goseiger Super Sentai 199 Hero Great Battle, Nozomu witnesses the Goseigers and Gokaigers' battle against the Black Cross Colossus and rallies Tokyo's frightened citizens into believing in the Super Sentai's power.

Mikoto Nakadai
 was a brilliant doctor who was bored with his life until he found the egg of the Burstosaur, Top Galer, and the Dino Minder brace, and used them to fight the Abarangers as  until he has a change of heart and helps them defeat the Evoliens before dying as a result of the Dino Minder's instability.

The ghosts of Nakadai, Dragon Ranger, and Time Fire appear before Gai Ikari in his dreams to give him the ability to transform into Gokai Silver and access to their respective teams' Great Powers.

Ryouma

Ryouma makes a minor appearance in the series, accepting the Gokaigers as the 35th Super Sentai despite them being space pirates.

Matsuri Tatsumi

Luka Millfy and Ahim de Famille encounter Matsuri as part of their quest to find the Greatest Treasure in the Universe. After seeing the Gokaigers battle Basco ta Jolokia, Matsuri gives the pirates her blessing and access to her team's Great Power.

Miu Sutō
Along the way, she briefly forms the G3 Princess idol group to defeat a separate foe.

During the events of the film Kaizoku Sentai Gokaiger the Movie: The Flying Ghost Ship, the Gokaigers use the Gorengers' powers to summon an illusion of Sutō and her fellow G3 Princess members to help them defeat Baseball Mask. After the Gokaigers defeat the Zangyack Empire in the series finale, Sutō regains her powers and expresses gratitude to the pirates.

Ninpuu Sentai Hurricaneger

After sensing the sons of two of Jakanja's fallen members within the Zangyack Empire's ranks, the Hurricanegers confront the Gokaigers for their powers back. Despite initial reluctance on the pirates' part, they agree and join forces with the ninjas to defeat Satarakura, Jr., during which the Hurricanegers give the Gokaigers their blessing and access to their team's Great Power.

Gai Yuki
In the process, he developed a rivalry with team leader Ryū Tendō / Red Hawk over the affections of their teammate Kaori Rokumeikan / White Swan. Following Vyram's fall, Yuki was fatally wounded while on his way to Rokumeikan and Tendō's wedding to give them his blessing.

While playing cards with God in the Golden Gate bar, Yuki convinces the latter to let him return to Earth long enough to help the Gokaigers obtain his team's Great Power and test Captain Marvelous' resolve in order to protect his teammates.

Yukito Sanjyo
 was a chiropractor who was chosen by the Burstosaur Triceratops to become  and join him and the Abarangers in fighting the Evoliens. Once the Evoliens were defeated and the Burstosaurs returned to Dino Earth, Sanjyo resumed his work as a chiropractor and eventually married his secretary, Emiri.

The Sanjyos appear before the Gokaigers to help them unlock the full potential of the Abarangers' Great Power.

Emiri Sanjyo
 was a high school student chosen by the Burstosaurs to help them in their fight against the Evoliens. While she was unable to become an Abaranger, she supported them nonetheless, occasionally assuming a homemade form called  along the way. After the Abarangers defeated the Evoliens, Emiri was eventually hired by Yukito Sanjyo to become his secretary and they eventually married.

While accompanying Yukito in helping the Gokaigers unlock the full potential of the Abarangers' Great Power, Emiri gives Ahim de Famille an Abare Pink Ranger Key the former made.

Joh Ohara
After rescuing his friend Goh Omura from Volt and defeating Volt's leader, Great Professor Bias, Ohara becomes a professor to ensure history does not repeat itself.

Ohara encounters Joe Gibken and Ahim de Famille while the pair were searching for him and assists them in rescuing boxers from the Zangyack Empire. Along the way, Ohara uncovers Zangyack's plan to convert physically fit humans into cyborgs, hints at his being part of the Livemen, relates his experiences with Volt to Gibken to help the pirate come to terms with his own friend turned enemy, and gives Gibken access to the Livemen's Great Power.

Sho Hayate

Sometime after the Legend War, he is attacked by Basco ta Jolokia, who steals his team's Great Power. In response, Hayate contacts Goro Hoshino of UAOH to warn him of Jolokia. After the Gokaigers defeat Jolokia, Hayate appears before the pirates to give them his blessing and access to the Great Power.

Goro Hoshino
Captain  is an ace pilot and team leader of the United Airforce Overtech Hardware (UAOH) who became  to lead the Ohrangers in their fight against the Baranoia Empire.

After learning Basco ta Jolokia stole the Changemen's Great Power, Hoshino sends his subordinate and teammate, Momo Maruo, to give the Gokaigers their team's Great Power while he distracts Jolokia. However, the pirates refuse to accept the Great Power unless they earned it themselves before doing so while fighting Jolokia.

Momo Maruo

Her superior and team leader, Goro Hoshino, sends her to give the Gokaigers their team's Great Power before Basco ta Jolokia can steal it. However, the pirates refuse unless they earned it themselves, which they do while fighting Jolokia.

Bomper
 is a pink radar robot created by Engine Jum-bowhale and an inhabitant of Machine World who supported the Go-ongers in their fight against Gaiark Clan by creating their arsenal and performing maintenance on the Engines.

While helping the Engines liberate Gunman World from the Gaiark, Bomper ends up in Human World, lands in the Gokaigers' Gokai Galleon, and asks the pirates to reunite him with his ally, Sōsuke Esumi.

Sōsuke Esumi
, nicknamed the "Speed King", is a former racer with a sunny disposition who was chosen by Engine Speedor to become  and lead the Go-ongers in their fight against the Gaiark Clan.

After the Gokaigers rescue Esumi's ally, Bomper, the latter guides them to Esumi, who ask the Gokaigers to help the Engines liberate Gunman World from the Gaiark. The pirates refuse, having already acquired the Go-ongers' Great Power, but agree to help after watching Esumi fail repeatedly to reach Gunman World. Despite being barred from Human World by the Gaiark Clan's leader, Babatcheed, Esumi accompanies the Gokaigers in traveling to Machine World to ask for Engine Machalcon's help in getting back.

Engines

While battling Chirakashizky in Gunman World, the Gaiark member drains the Engines' power. They are later reunited with Sōsuke Esumi and reveal that Speedor and BearRV had a son, Machalcon, whom they never see due to their battles with the Gaiark.

Kenta Date
 was originally an underachieving senior at Moroboshi High School who was chosen to become the Megarangers' leader, after winning an INET recruitment device disguised as an arcade game and battled the Nezirejia Kingdom. Sometime after defeating Nezirejia's leader, Doctor Hinelar, Date became a teacher at Moroboshi High.

After the Gokaigers seek him out for his team's Great Power, Date offers to give it to them if they become students for a day. While watching their progress from afar, Date is captured by Basco ta Jolokia, who threatens to detonate bombs he has placed all over Moroboshi High unless Date gives him the Megarangers' Great Power. However, the Gokaigers intervene, defeating Jolokia and safely disposing the bombs. Afterwards, Date gives the pirates his team's Great Power as promised.

Domon
While in the past, Domon reveals his identity to and enters a relationship with journalist, Honami Moriyama, unknowingly conceiving a son with her in the process. Once the Timerangers' mission was over, Domon fails to learn of his son before returning to his time.

After learning the Matrintis Empire destroyed the Negakure Shrine, depriving the Gokaigers of the Kakurangers' Great Power, Domon tasks the pirates with traveling back in time to the year 2010 to prevent the shrine's destruction. After the Gokaigers succeed, they send Domon a picture they took of themselves, Moriyama, and Domon's son.

Honami Moriyama
 is a journalist who discovered the Timerangers' secret identities while taking photos of the Londerz Family and falls in love with Timeranger member, Domon, conceiving a son she later names Mirai with him in the process.

While in the year 2010 to prevent the Negakure Shrine's destruction, the Gokaigers encounter Moriyama and help her reconcile with Mirai.

Mirai Moriyama
, initially and jokingly referred to as "Domon Jr.", is Honami Moriyama and Domon's son that she never told him about.

While in the year 2010 to prevent the Negakure Shrine's destruction, the Gokaigers encounter Mirai, who ran away from home in protest over Moriyama's journalism career resulting in their constantly moving before he can make friends. Gai Ikari helps him reconcile with his mother before indirectly revealing Mirai's existence to Domon.

Shiro Akebono

Accompanied by his pet panda, Akebono disguises himself as Santa Claus to observe the Gokaigers during Christmas and see if they are worthy of his team's Great Power. After the pirates save Christmas from the Zangyack Empire, Akebono gives them his blessing and his team's Great Power as a present. In the film Kaizoku Sentai Gokaiger vs. Space Sheriff Gavan: The Movie, Akebono and Daigoro Oume help the Gokaigers rescue Retsu Ichijouji.

Shiro Akebono is portrayed by Kenji Ohba, who reprises his role from Battle Fever J and also appears as Daigoro Oume of Denshi Sentai Denjiman and Retsu Ichijouji of Space Sheriff Gavan.

Ninjaman
 is a pupil of the Three Shinshou who was sealed in a pot after being tricked by Daimaou of the Youkai Army Corps into attacking people centuries ago until Tsuruhime frees him in 1994 to assist her and the Kakurangers in fighting the Youkai Army Corps. Once the Youkai were sealed, Ninjaman and his mentors part ways with the Kakurangers on good terms.

Following this however, Ninjaman's reckless methods for saving a girl from rampaging zoo animals led to the Shinshou sealing him in a pot once more and place him in the Negakure Shrine to think about what he did for a decade. In 2010, the Gokaigers free Ninjaman so he can help them acquire the Kakurangers' Great Power. After learning of what happened since his second sealing, Ninjaman tests the pirates to see if they are worthy of the Great Power before joining forces with them to stop Zangyack forces and learning he was the Great Power in the process. After the battle, he parts ways with the Gokaigers, promising to help them again should they need him.

Tsuruhime

She seeks out the Gokaigers to see if they are worthy of her team's Great Power, only to learn they had met Ninjaman and leaves him to fulfill her task instead.

Bae
 is a practitioner of the  style who enjoys commentating on giant battles and was originally dependent on Mere to survive until he absorbed some of Long's Rinki and joined the Gekirangers following Mere's death.

As of the film Kaizoku Sentai Gokaiger vs. Space Sheriff Gavan: The Movie, Bae was imprisoned in the Zangyack Empire's Makuu Prison until the Gokaigers free him and the other inmates.

Yatsudenwani
 is a Fatsia japonica/telephone/crocodile-themed monster created by the Evoliens to fight the Abarangers, but defected to them instead and eventually became the president of the Dino House curry restaurant.

As of the film Kaizoku Sentai Gokaiger vs. Space Sheriff Gavan: The Movie, Yatsudenwani was imprisoned in the Zangyack Empire's Makuu Prison until the Gokaigers free him and the other inmates. During the events of Tokumei Sentai Go-Busters vs. Kaizoku Sentai Gokaiger: The Movie, a past version of Yatsudenwani treats Captain Marvelous to curry after the latter was sent back in time to 2005 until Hiromu Sakurada interrupts them.

Takayuki Hiba
 was a member of the Guardians of World Peace who was selected to succeed his colleague, Ryusuke Ohwashi, as the leader of the Sun Vulcan team and become  to fight the Machine Empire Black Magma.

After the Gokaigers defeat Basco ta Jolokia, who had stolen the Sun Vulcan team's Great Power, Hiba appears before the pirates to give them his blessing and access to the Great Power. Following the Gokaigers defeating the Zangyack Empire in the series finale, Hiba receives his powers back and salutes the pirates as a sign of thanks.

Dai
 was one of five children who were abducted by the Mess Empire for use as guinea pigs until the inhabitants of Planet Flash rescued and raised them, with Dai being raised on the rocky Green Star and developing enhanced strength as a result. In adulthood, he became , joined the other abductees in forming the Flashmen, and returned to Earth to stop Mess from conquering it.

After the Gokaigers defeat Basco ta Jolokia, who had stolen the Flashmen's Great Power, Dai appears before the pirates to give them his blessing and access to the Great Power.

Akira
 was a Chinese boxer and straight sword expert who was trained by Commander Sanjuro Sugata to obtain Aura Power, become , and join the Maskmen in fighting the Underground Empire Tube.

After the Gokaigers defeat Basco ta Jolokia, who had stolen the Maskmen's Great Power, Akira appears before the pirates to give them his blessing and access to the Great Power.

Remi Hoshikawa

After the Gokaigers defeat Basco ta Jolokia, who had stolen the Fivemen's Great Power, Hoshikawa appears before the pirates to give them her blessing and access to the Great Power. Following the Gokaigers defeating the Zangyack Empire in the series finale, Hoshikawa receives her powers back and expresses gratitude to the pirates.

Goushi

Amidst the Zangyack Empire's last-ditch attempt to conquer Earth and destroy the Gokaigers, Goushi tells Gai Ikari not to worry about what will happen to him and the other Super Sentai groups if the Gokaigers use the Greatest Treasure in the Universe. After the Gokaigers defeat the Zangyack Empire, Goushi receives his powers back and expresses gratitude to the pirates.

Shuichirou Amachi
 is an amateur astronomer and single father to Nozomu Amachi who runs the Amachi Institute. He hires the Goseigers as part-timers despite initially being unaware of their actions until he eventually learns the truth and supports them nonetheless.

Amidst the Zangyack Empire's last-ditch attempt to conquer Earth and destroy the Gokaigers, Joe Gibken and Don Dogoier witness Amachi rescuing injured civilians.

Yuka Yamazaki
 was a classmate of Kai Ozu, who developed a crush on her. When she was kidnapped by Glúm do Bridon, Kai as Magi Red rescued her and inadvertently revealed his secret identity to her.

Amidst the Zangyack Empire's last-ditch attempt to conquer Earth and destroy the Gokaigers, Joe Gibken and Don Dogoier witness Yamazaki comfort an injured civilian with a Magi Red plush doll she had made as a good luck charm.

Houka Ozu

After the Gokaigers defeat the Zangyack Empire in the series finale, Houka happily receives her powers back and thanks the pirates.

Shou Tatsumi

After the Gokaigers defeat the Zangyack Empire in the series finale, Shou receives his powers back and salutes the pirates as thanks.

Shoji of the Heavenly Gravity Star

After the Gokaigers defeat the Zangyack Empire in the series finale, Shoji and his teammate Kazu of the Heavenly Time Star receive their powers back and thank the pirates.

Kazu of the Heavenly Time Star

After the Gokaigers defeat the Zangyack Empire in the series finale, Kazu and his teammate Shoji of the Heavenly Gravity Star receive their powers back and thank the pirates.

Past antagonists
In addition to the various new antagonists introduced in Kaizoku Sentai Gokaiger, several antagonists from prior Super Sentai series appear as well, with some forming an alliance with Zangyack while others pursue their own agenda.

Black Cross King

During the events of the crossover film Gokaiger Goseiger Super Sentai 199 Hero Great Battle, the Black Cross Führer is revived by the combined hatred of all of the Super Sentai teams' enemies as the Black Cross King and forms an alliance with Zangyack in order to seek revenge on all Super Sentai and their supporters. To assist him and battle the Gokaigers and Goseigers, he revives several fallen Sentai enemies as members of the Black Cross Army while he steals the Gokaigers' Ranger Keys in order to turn them into his personal army. After the Gokaigers and Goseigers retrieve the keys, the Black Cross King enlarges himself, but is briefly defeated by the two Sentai teams via the Super Sentai Bazooka. In the crossover film, Kamen Rider × Super Sentai: Super Hero Taisen, the Black Cross King is revived once more and joins Dai-Zangyack, who form an alliance with Dai-Shocker in a plot to destroy the Super Sentai and Kamen Riders, only to be defeated by them.

Brajira
 was a fallen Gosei Angel who manipulated various groups to battle the Goseigers before giving up his life in an attempt to enact his Nega End Ceremony to destroy Earth and reshape it in his image, only to be foiled by the Goseigers.

After transforming into the Black Cross Colossus, the Black Cross King revives Brajira once more, who summons phantoms of his Buredoran forms before he is destroyed by the first 35 Super Sentai teams' mecha. In the crossover film, Kamen Rider × Super Sentai: Super Hero Taisen, Brajira is revived once more and joins Dai-Zangyack, who form an alliance with Dai-Shocker in a plot to destroy the Super Sentai and Kamen Riders, only to be defeated by them.

Yogoshimacritein
 was the leader of the Gaiark Clan's Human World invasion force who fell in battle against the Go-ongers.

After transforming into the Black Cross Colossus, the Black Cross King revives Yogoshimacritein once more, who summons phantoms of his subordinates, Chirakasonne and Kireizky, before they are destroyed by the first 35 Super Sentai teams' mecha.

Dagon
 was the seemingly invincible leader of the Infershia Pantheon who battled the Magirangers while attempting to revive the Infershia Empire's ruler, N Ma, only to be killed by turncoat Hades Goddess, Sphinx.

After transforming into the Black Cross Colossus, the Black Cross King revives Dagon once more, who summons phantoms of his fellow Hades Gods, Ifrit and Cyclops, before they are destroyed by the first 35 Super Sentai teams' mecha. In the crossover film, Kamen Rider × Super Sentai: Super Hero Taisen, Dagon is revived once more and joins Dai-Zangyack, who form an alliance with Dai-Shocker in a plot to destroy the Super Sentai and Kamen Riders, only to be defeated by them.

Ryuuwon
 was the leader of the Jyaryu Clan and an enemy of the Boukengers until he died when the SGS Foundation's Precious Bank self-destructed.

While Captain Marvelous pulls the Heart of Hades out of Ryuuwon's chest, this causes the latter to go berserk and enlarge himself before he is destroyed by GokaiOh via the Boukengers' Great Power.

Baseball Mask
 is a baseball-themed member of the Black Cross Army who was destroyed by the Gorengers, who exploited his inability to hit changeups.

During the events of the film Kaizoku Sentai Gokaiger the Movie: The Flying Ghost Ship, Baseball Mask's spirit challenges the Gokaigers to a baseball match while they were on Los Dark's ghost ship. While the Gokaigers use the Gorengers' powers to defeat him, Baseball Mask takes his second death gracefully.

Agent Abrella
 is an arms dealer from Planet Rain who supplied various alien criminals while working on his own scheme to eliminate the Dekarangers, only to be destroyed by them.

During the events of the film Kaizoku Sentai Gokaiger the Movie: The Flying Ghost Ship, the Gokaigers encounter Abrella's spirit and army of Mechanoids while on Los Dark's ghost ship. On a gambit, the other Gokaigers battle Abrella and the Mechanoids while Captain Marvelous takes the God's Eye from Los Dark and uses it to bring his shipmates back to the land of the living.

Kegalesia
 was one of the Gaiark Clan's pollution ministers who fought the Go-ongers, briefly forming the G3 Princess idol group to defeat a separate foe along the way. After being mistreated by her leader Yogoshimacritein, she and her fellow pollution minister Kitaneidas weaken him before Yogoshimacritein scraps them for their betrayal. As of the crossover film Samurai Sentai Shinkenger vs. Go-onger: GinmakuBang!!, Kegalesia, Kitaneidas, and fellow pollution minister Yogostein ended up in the Sanzu River before the Gaiark's new leader, Batcheed, resurrects them to assist in his plans. However, the ministers choose not to in favor of returning to the Sanzu River, indirectly helping the Go-ongers and Shinkengers defeat Batcheed in the process.

In the film Kaizoku Sentai Gokaiger the Movie: The Flying Ghost Ship, the Gokaigers use the Gorengers' powers to summon an illusion of Kegalesia and her fellow G3 Princess members to help them defeat Baseball Mask. As of the crossover film Kaizoku Sentai Gokaiger vs. Space Sheriff Gavan: The Movie, Kegalesia and her fellow ministers were imprisoned in the Zangyack Empire's Makuu Prison before the Gokaigers free them and the other inmates.

Shitari
 is a squid-headed demon and the Gedoushu's strategist who awaited his leader, Doukoku's revival following the latter's death in battle against the Shinkengers.

In the crossover film Tensou Sentai Goseiger vs. Shinkenger: Epic on Ginmaku and the Kaizoku Sentai Gokaiger episode "The Future is in the Past", Shitari gathered an army of Doukoku loyalists to kill Brajira, who assumed command of the Gedoushu. However, they are destroyed by the Gokaigers, who had traveled back in time for an unrelated mission and sought to repay the Shinkengers and Goseigers for their Great Powers.

Metal Alice
 is Robogorg's personal attendant, a Matrintis Empire marshal, and the first high-spec Matroid built by her master to serve him.

Prior to her and Robogorg's battle with the Goseigers, Metal Alice sends Zan-KT0 of the Shot to investigate a power source she detected in the Negakure Shrine. While the Matroid is destroyed by the Gokaigers, who had traveled back in time to prevent the shrine's destruction, Metal Alice chooses to modify the Zan-KT specs in preparation for the Goseigers instead of pursuing the Gokaigers.

Gekkou
 is the owl-like leader of the Dark Shadow ninja clan who sends his servants to retrieve Precious to sell on the black market, which brought them into conflict with the Boukengers.

As of the crossover film Kaizoku Sentai Gokaiger vs. Space Sheriff Gavan: The Movie, Gekkou was imprisoned in the Zangyack Empire's Makuu Prison before the Gokaigers free him and the other inmates.

Shizuka
 is a Dark Shadow kunoichi who carried the task of obtaining Precious and embarking in business affairs for the clan, fighting the Boukengers along the way.

As of the crossover film Kaizoku Sentai Gokaiger vs. Space Sheriff Gavan: The Movie, Shizuka was imprisoned in the Zangyack Empire's Makuu Prison before the Gokaigers free her and the other inmates.

Yogostein
 was one of the Gaiark Clan's pollution ministers who fought the Go-ongers before he was killed by Go-on Red while attempting to avenge his fallen vice minister Hiramechimedes. As of the crossover film Samurai Sentai Shinkenger vs. Go-onger: GinmakuBang!!, Yogostein and his fellow pollution ministers ended up in the Sanzu River before the Gaiark's new leader, Batcheed, resurrects them to assist in his plans, though they choose not to and return to the Sanzu River instead.

As of the film Kaizoku Sentai Gokaiger vs. Space Sheriff Gavan: The Movie, Yogostein and his fellow ministers were imprisoned in the Zangyack Empire's Makuu Prison before the Gokaigers free them and the other inmates.

Yogostein is voiced by Kiyoyuki Yanada, who reprises his role from Engine Sentai Go-onger.

Kitaneidas
 was one of the Gaiark Clan's pollution ministers who fought the Go-ongers. After being mistreated by his leader Yogoshimacritein, he and his fellow pollution minister Kegalesia weaken him before Yogoshimacritein scraps them for their betrayal. As of the film Samurai Sentai Shinkenger vs. Go-onger: GinmakuBang!!, Kitaneidas and his fellow pollution ministers ended up in the Sanzu River before the Gaiark's new leader, Batcheed, resurrects them to assist in his plans, though they choose not to and return to the Sanzu River instead.

As of the film Kaizoku Sentai Gokaiger vs. Space Sheriff Gavan: The Movie, Kitaneidas and his fellow ministers were imprisoned in the Zangyack Empire's Makuu Prison before the Gokaigers free them and the other inmates.

Vancuria
 was the self-proclaimed "Queen of the Vampires" and an immortal spy for the Infershia Empire who fought the Magirangers. After forming a bond with Hades Goddess Sphinx and seeing her killed by her fellow Hades Gods however, Vancuria revived Sphinx, helped the Magirangers defeat the Infershia emperor, N Ma, and joined Sphinx in reforming the Infershia Empire.

As of the crossover film Kaizoku Sentai Gokaiger vs. Space Sheriff Gavan: The Movie, Vancuria was imprisoned in the Zangyack Empire's Makuu Prison before the Gokaigers free her and the other inmates.

References

Super Sentai characters